Novonikolayevskoye is a rural locality (a village) in Mrakovsky Selsoviet, Kugarchinsky District, Bashkortostan, Russia. The population was 328 as of 2010. There are 3 streets.

Geography 
Novonikolayevskoye is located 8 km southwest of Mrakovo (the district's administrative centre) by road. Kanakachevo is the nearest rural locality.

References 

Rural localities in Kugarchinsky District